Desande Automobielen BV was a Dutch-British manufacturer of neoclassic automobiles with retro styling combined with modern technology. The automobile's distinctive styling was based on the high-end automobiles of the 1930s. Despite their retro looks, Desandes used modern American drive trains and suspension systems. While the company was based in Hulst in the Netherlands, the founder Danny G. Vandezande (hence the car's name) was a Belgian, the cars mechanics were American, and the vehicle was built in England. The company's Belgian branch was headquartered in the small town of Schilde.

History

Danny G. Vandezande presented the first Desande in 1979. Production of the aluminium bodywork was carried out by Grand Prix Metalcraft in North London. GP Metalcraft had been exclusively a supplier of Formula 1 aluminium body parts but expanded to making bodywork for Cobras and other replicas after the fuel crisis placed the future of motor sports in doubt. Vandezande felt that only such a small British firm would be able of executing the bodywork to a high enough standard for the Desande, although he had to switch after the original company proved not to have the necessary expertise. To further confuse matters, the company behind the car is often identified as JBS Associates, Ltd., also of London.

The car
The Desande Roadster originally used the chassis and mechanicals from the Ford LTD II and Ford Thunderbird. This meant a  wheelbase and V8 engines of 4.9 or 5.8 liters coupled to a three-speed automatic transmission. As with many other neoclassics, the car used the doors from the Austin-Healey Sprite/MG Midget.

After only a handful of Ford-based cars had been built, Desande presented the Desande II Roadster in March 1980. The name change indicated a switch to using Canadian-built Chevrolet Caprice/Impala chassis, fitted with a General Motors 5.0-liter V8 mated to a three-speed Turbo Hydra-Matic.

The car was always luxuriously equipped, with electrically adjustable connolly leather seats, climate control, walnut dashboard, and lambswool carpets. Right-hand drive was available for an additional £4,000, the price of a small car at the time. Grand Prix Metalcraft handbuilt the bodywork out of aluminium aside from the MG Midget-derived central section. The radiator cowl was made from brass while the headlight housings were spun from gilding metal. Engine specifications varied as the General Motors donor cars were changed; in a 1982 road test Desande claimed  DIN at 3400 rpm.

Production was limited to twenty cars per year and a maximum total of 250 cars, with the chassis plates (a gold plated one being mounted near the door) being numbered accordingly, but it is unknown how many were actually built. Grand Prix Metalcraft was working on the fourteenth car in mid-1982. Several sources state that production ended in 1984, but GP Metalcrafts displayed the car in 1985 and there are cars with titles as late as 1989. Later models are called Desande Caprice.

References

Defunct motor vehicle manufacturers of England
Cars of the Netherlands
Vehicle manufacturing companies established in 1979
Motor vehicle manufacturers based in London
Vehicle manufacturing companies disestablished in 1984
1979 establishments in the Netherlands
1984 disestablishments in the Netherlands
Retro-style automobiles